Boulogne is a former commune in the Vendée department, region of Pays de la Loire, France. On 1 January 2016, it was merged into the new commune of Essarts-en-Bocage.

See also
Communes of the Vendée department

References

Former communes of Vendée